Lidan Subdistrict is a subdistrict of Li County in Hunan, China. The subdistrict is the former Lidan Rownship reorganized as a subdistrict in 2013. The subdistrict has 4 villages and 12 communities under its jurisdiction, its seat is Dengjiatan Village.

History
The subdistrict of Lidan is originally the former Lidan Township. the former Lidong Township ceased to be a separate township in 2015, 6 villages of which were merged to it. Minyan Village of Cennan Town was transferred to it in 2017.

Subdivisions
The subdistrict of Lidan had 12 communities and 6 villages at its establishment in 2015. Through the amalgamation of villages in 2016, its villages were reduced to 3. in 2017, Minyan Village of Cennan Town was transferred to it in 2017, the subdistrict of Lidan has 4 villages and 12 communities under its jurisdiction.

4 villages	 
 Caikoutan Village, established at merging two villages of Changqing and Chejiaxi in 2016.
 Dengjiatan Village
 Lidong Village
 Minyan Village

12 communities
 Baiyanghu Community
 Caijin Community
 Daxiangkou Community
 Dongzhou Community
 Jiati Community
 Renhe Community
 Sanjia Community
 Shangfu Community
 Yonggu Community
 Yongxian Community
 Yuhuang Community
 Zhangliu Community

External links
 Official Website

References

Li County, Hunan
Towns of Hunan